The UK Dance Singles Chart is a weekly music chart compiled in the United Kingdom by the Official Charts Company (OCC) from sales of songs in the dance music genre (house, drum and bass, dubstep, etc.) in record stores and digital downloads. The chart week runs from Friday to Thursday with the chart-date given as the following Thursday.

This is a list of the songs which were number one on the UK Dance Singles Chart during 2018.

Chart history

 – the single was simultaneously number-one on the singles chart.

Number-one artists

See also

List of number-one singles of 2018 (UK)
List of UK Dance Albums Chart number ones of 2018
List of UK R&B Singles Chart number ones of 2018
List of UK Rock & Metal Singles Chart number ones of 2018
List of UK Independent Singles Chart number ones of 2018

References

External links
Dance Singles Top 40 at the Official Charts Company
UK Top 40 Dance Singles at BBC Radio 1

2018 in British music
United Kingdom Dance Singles
2018